The Otto Hahn Prize is awarded biennially jointly by the Society of German Chemists, the German Physical Society and the city of Frankfurt am Main for outstanding achievement in the field of chemistry, physics or applied engineering science. It was established in 2005 by the merger of the previous Otto Hahn Prize for Chemistry and Physics and the Otto Hahn Prize of the City of Frankfurt am Main. The award is presented in the St. Paul's Church, Frankfurt am Main.

The award named after the German nuclear scientist and Nobel laureate Otto Hahn and consists of a gold medal and a prize of 50,000 euros. It is awarded alternatively for Chemistry and Physics.

Recipients: Otto Hahn Prize 
Source: Society of German Chemists

 2005: Theodor W. Hänsch (physics)
 2007: Gerhard Ertl (chemistry)
 2009: Stefan Hell (physics)
 2011: Manfred T. Reetz (chemistry)
 2013: Ferenc Krausz (physics)
 2015: Jürgen Troe (chemistry)
 2017:  (physics)
 2019: , Stuttgart (chemistry)
 2021: Klaus Blaum (physics)

Recipients: Otto Hahn Prize for Chemistry and Physics

1955: Lise Meitner, Heinrich Wieland
1959: Hans Meerwein
1962: Manfred Eigen
1965: Erich Hückel
1967: Georg Wittig
1974: Friedrich Hund
1979: Rolf Huisgen
1982: Walter Greiner
1986: Heinz Maier-Leibnitz
1989: Rudolf Hoppe
1998: Dieter Oesterhelt
2000: 
2003: Helmut Schwarz
2005: merged with Otto Hahn Prize of the City of Frankfurt am Main

Recipients: Otto Hahn Prize of the City of Frankfurt am Main
Source:

 1970: Karl zum Winkel
 1972: Rudolf Schulten, Physicist and nuclear technologist
 1974: August Weckesser
 1976: Adolf Birkhofer
 1979: Wolfgang Gentner
 1980: Otto Haxel
 1982: Walter Greiner
 1984: Heinz Maier-Leibnitz
 1986: Klaus Knizia
 1988: Franz Baumgärtner
 1992: Olga Aleinikova
 1994: Willi Wölfli
 1996: Gottfried Münzenberg, Sigurd Hofmann
 1998: Hans Blix, Jens Volker Kratz, Norbert Trautmann
 2000: Hartmut Eickhoff, Thomas Haberer, Gerhard Kraft

See also
Otto Hahn Medal
Otto Hahn Peace Medal
List of chemistry awards
List of physics awards
List of engineering awards
List of prizes named after people

References

This article is based on a translation of the equivalent article on German Wikipedia

Awards established in 2005
Otto Hahn
Awards of the German Physical Society
Awards of the Society of German Chemists